Sarah Pierce (1767–1852), was an educator.

Sarah Pierce may refer to:

 Sarah Pierce, a character in the film Little Children, played by Kate Winslet
Sarah Pierce, character in Private Practice, played by Juliette Goglia
 Sarah Meriwether Pierce, wife of Robert Lawson, officer from Virginia in the American Revolutionary War